Aphis affinis is an aphid of the family Aphididae. The species was described by Giacomo del Guercio in 1911. It is found in southern Europe, the Middle East and the Indian subcontinent. Ladybird predator species of A. affinis include Brumoides suturalis, Cheilomenes sexmaculata and Coccinella transversalis.

References

Aphis
Insects described in 1911
Insects of the Middle East